Erfan Ali Saeed (born December 20, 1983) is a professional basketball player. He plays for El Jaish SC of the Qatar basketball league.  He is also a member of the Qatar national basketball team.

Ali competed for the Qatar national basketball team at the 2007 and FIBA Asia Championship 2009.  He also competed for Qatar at their only FIBA World Championship performance to date, in 2006, where he averaged 10 points and 5 rebounds per game.

References

1983 births
Living people
Qatari men's basketball players
Place of birth missing (living people)
Asian Games medalists in basketball
Basketball players at the 2006 Asian Games
Basketball players at the 2014 Asian Games
Small forwards
Power forwards (basketball)
Asian Games silver medalists for Qatar
Medalists at the 2006 Asian Games
2006 FIBA World Championship players